The 2018 AFL Women's (AFLW) draft consisted of the various periods when the ten clubs in the Australian rules football women's competition could recruit players prior to the competition's 2019 season.

As in the previous season, all player contracts are all capped at one-year deals, and all existing AFLW players must be re-signed prior to the 2019 season.

Salary 

AFLW players salaries are managed and paid in full by the AFL on behalf of the clubs. For the 2019 season, the league and the AFLPA agreed to the AFLW's first collective bargaining agreement (CBA). The four-tiered system salary provided for two players per team in tier one, six in each of tier two and tier three, and the remaining players in tier four:

Expansion club signing period 
These clubs could sign a maximum of four players between them from any existing club. No compensation was offered to those clubs losing players under this process, but the each player's existing club could make a counter-offer to the player. A number of deals were agreed to in principle and acknowledged by clubs prior to the opening of this window.

Signing and trading period 

Beginning 23 May, clubs were given a 13-day window to re-sign players on their lists from the previous season During this time clubs were also permitted to arrange player and pick trades with other clubs.

Players who do not receive offers from their 2017 club will be free to sign with any club during the four-day free agency period starting 4 June or to nominate for the 2018 draft.

Trades

Retirements and delistings

Free agency 
A four-day free agency period was held from 4 June for clubs to secure non-signed players from other clubs.

A second free agency period is expected to be opened at the conclusion of the draft, allowing un-drafted players to be signed.

Rookie signings 
In the absence of a rookie draft, each club was required to sign two rookie players during a rookie signing period between 11 June and 28 September 2018; these rookie players must not have played Australian rules football within the previous three years or been involved in an AFLW high-performance program.

Inactive players 
Following final list lodgements, a number of players experienced changing circumstances that made them unable to participate in the 2019 season. Clubs were granted permission to place these players on an inactive list, retaining rights to their services at a assigned cost in the 2019 draft while replacing them for the one season. In some cases, compensation was awarded in pre-draft listing at the cost of a discounted draft selection. Players on each club's inactive list ahead of the 2018 draft are listed below:

Draft 
A draft was held at Melbourne's Marvel Stadium on 23 October 2018. As in previous drafts, players nominated a single state's draft pool, and players are eligible to be drafted only by clubs operating in their nominated state. In addition, Victorian players could nominate for one of three Victorian zones: Geelong, Melbourne metro, or the entire state. An order for the draft was announced on 22 May that allocated Geelong and North Melbourne picks at the end of each of each round, and a number of compensation picks to Geelong and clubs that lost players to reflect the relative weakness of their recruiting period and their loss of talent respectively.

Undrafted free agency 
A final free agency period opened after the conclusion of the draft, allowing clubs that passed on a draft selection to recruit from outside their state-based zone.

See also 
 2018 AFL draft

Notes

References 

AFL Women's draft
Draft
AFL women's draft
2010s in Melbourne
Australian rules football in Victoria (Australia)
Sport in Melbourne
Events in Melbourne